Toni Grncarov (born February 8, 1980) is a former Macedonian professional basketball player born in Skopje. He is 1.92 m (6 ft 4 in) in height and played at the guard position. He is a brother of Boban Grnčarov, who is a football player in FK Vardar.

Achievements
Strumica 2005
Macedonian League Champion – 2007
Rabotnicki
Macedonian League Champion – 2009
MZT Skopje
Macedonian League Champion – 2012
Macedonian Cup Winner – 2000, 2012

General manager
On 21 November 2017, he was appointed as General Manager of his former basketball club MZT Skopje until December 2021.

External links
 Toni Grncarov profile at Eurobasket.com

References

1980 births
Living people
Macedonian men's basketball players
Sportspeople from Skopje
KK MZT Skopje players
KK Rabotnički players
Guards (basketball)